Keene Pond is a  pond in Duxbury, Massachusetts in the Ashdod section of the town. The pond is located east of Stump Pond. Keene Brook, a tributary of the South River, flows through the pond. Camp Wing, a summer camp for children age 7–16 run by Crossroads for Kids, Inc., is located on the eastern shore of the pond.

External links
Environmental Protection Agency
South Shore Coastal Watersheds - Lake Assessments
Crossroads for Kids, Inc.

Ponds of Plymouth County, Massachusetts
Duxbury, Massachusetts
Ponds of Massachusetts